Appalachia Waltz is a ballet made by Miriam Mahdaviani to excerpts from Edgar Meyer and Mark O'Connor's Appalachia Waltz, which was part of New York City Ballet's Diamond Project. The premiere took place Wednesday, June 20, 2000 at the New York State Theater, Lincoln Center.

Original cast 

Jenifer Ringer
Jennie Somogyi
Albert Evans
Nilas Martins

Reviews 

 
June 22, 2000 Anna Kisselgoff, NY Times
July 9, 2000 Anna Kisselgoff, NY Times
June, 2000 Wendy Perron, Dance Magazine

2000 Alicia Mosier, Dance Insider
May 22, 2001 Jack Anderson, NY Times
May 24, 2001 Jennifer Dunning, NY Times

References

Ballets by Miriam Mahdaviani
2000 ballet premieres
New York City Ballet repertory
New York City Ballet Diamond Project